Clubland is a 1999 American musical film directed by Mary Lambert.

Reference list

External links
 
 

1999 films
Films directed by Mary Lambert
1990s musical films
1990s English-language films